Butterflies with New Wings Building a Future (Butterflies) (Spanish: Red Mariposas de Alas Nuevas Construyendo Futuro) is a non-prof organization from Buenaventura, Colombia. The organization is a self- help group of forcibly displaced and local women. The organization was established in 2010. It consists of nine women's rights groups. During 2014 the group was led by Mery Medina, Gloria Amparo and Maritza Asprilla.

The situation in Buenaventura

Buenaventura was described as Colombia’s horror capital. In the coastal city drug trafficking, gang violence and turf wars primarily between right-wing paramilitary networks and leftist rebels are rampant. The streets are regularly patrolled by soldiers.  Abductions and sexual violence committed against girls occur regularly. Unemployment rates are high and wages are very low. The community largely consists of afro-Colombians. Additionally Colombia has been dealing with an armed conflict between the FARC militia and the government. During this conflict crimes against humanity such as genocide, hostage-taking or other serious violations of liberty, torture, forced displacement, forced disappearance, extrajudicial executions and sexual violence have been taking place over and over again. Last year, 5% of the port city's population of 370,000 was forced to flee for their lives, according to Human Rights Watch. According to UNHCR since 1995 147,000 people have been displaced in the city. Human Rights Watch (HRW) stated that in 2013 violence drove more than 19,000 people from their homes in Buenaventura, more than in any other municipality in Colombia. Also according to human rights watch there had been 2.000 investigations on disappearances and forced displacements with no convictions.
A report by the Norwegian Refugee Council stated: “Due to the sexual assault and abuse of women and girls in their homes or in public places, such as stores and on the way to school, women live in a state of fear. Mothers are afraid to let their daughters out alone. In Buenaventura, there is a sustained collective fear that undermines the community’s social welfare.”

Work
Butterflies provides for victims of abuse. It also reaches out to communities to educate women. One goal is also to pressure the authorities to uphold women's rights. Since its foundation the organization has helped over 1000 women and their families. Butterflies often help women and girls that became victims of sexual violence. In the long brewing conflict in Colombia over the course of 50 years overall 200.000 people have died and 5.3 million people are registered as internally replaced persons. Those internally replaced persons are more vulnerable for abuse. Butterflies provides psychosocial care for these victims. They also work to educate women about their rights so that more crimes are reported. During their work Butterflies are often threatened by the armed militias or gangs that are controlling the areas in which they work.
The organization has for example established a food and savings scheme, which helps women who struggle financially to put food on the table and also save money for a more secure life as in the poor regions of Colombia some people don't have access to bank accounts or a credit card. 
The organization also organizes protests against the violence against women in Colombia. With the money the organization won from the Nansen Refugee Award, which amounted to 100.000 $, they want to build a shelter for abused women.
The Butterflies group offers women short-term shelter, psychological counseling and vocational training. The group receives funding from several foreign human rights groups and international aid organizations, including USAID. U.N. High Commissioner for Refugees Antonio Guterres cited Butterflies With New Wings for helping 1,000 women and their families: "Every day they try to heal the wounds of the women and children of Buenaventura, putting their own lives at risk."

Philosophy
Butterflies see their network of women as a network of "comadero". Comadero means godfather. Godfathering has had an important role in the Colombian society as families took care of each other. Within Butterflies the women take care of the other women as if they were godfathers or "comadero".

References

Women's organisations based in Colombia
Violence against women in Colombia
Nansen Refugee Award laureates